Megales Epitihies (Greatest Hits) is a compilation album by Greek pop folk artist Eleftheria Arvanitaki. It was released in 1995 on Lyra. The album anthologizes most of Eleftheria's oeuvre up to 1995.

Track listing 
 "Stin Arhi Tou Tragoudiou"
 "Stis Akres Ap' Ta Matia Sou"
 "Efyges Noris"
 "Erotiko"
 "I Akti"
 "To Kokkino Foustani" 
 "Ena Ohi"
 "Afto To Vrady" 
 "Nihta Magemeni"
 "To Kordelaki"
 "Stin Magemeni Arapia"
 "Zehra"
 "Den Me Ponese Kaneis"
 "Tha Spaso Koupes"
 "To Koritsi Apopse Thelei" 
 "Moizeis Kai Si San Thalassa"
 "Hronia Tora Makria Sou Liono"
 "Arapiko Louloudi"

Eleftheria Arvanitaki compilation albums
Greek-language albums
1995 compilation albums